The General Brock Open was a golf tournament played at Lookout Point Country Club, Fonthill, Ontario, Canada, west of Niagara Falls. It was played from 1935 to 1937. The event was sponsored by the General Brock Hotel.

The 1935 event was played from July 11 to 13. Tony Manero won by a strokes from Canadian amateur Bud Donovan and Byron Nelson. Manero had a final round 71 to pass Nelson who finished with a 77. The 1936 event was played from June 11 to 13. Craig Wood won by two strokes after a final round of 68. The 1937 event was played from July 8 to 10. The tournament was won by Jules Huot who finished two ahead of Bill Mehlhorn. Huot took a three stroke lead after 54 holes after a third round 66.

Winners

References

Former PGA Tour events
Golf tournaments in Ontario